The zinc 10-cent coin was minted in the Netherlands between 1941 and 1943 during World War II. It was worth 1/10, or .10, of the guilder, and designed by Nico de Haas, a Dutch national-socialist. The respective mintage was of 29,800,000 (1941), 95,600,000 (1942), 29,000,000 (1943).

References

Netherlands in World War II
Coins of the Netherlands
Modern obsolete currencies
Zinc and aluminum coins minted in Germany and occupied territories during World War II
Ten-cent coins